Ganiyu Owolabi (born 10 May 1973) is a Nigerian former professional footballer who played as a midfielder.

Career
Born in Ilorih, Owolabi played for Buffalo FC, Antwerp, Viking, Al-Wasl, Dender, Berchem Sport and Ethnikos Asteras.

Personal life
His son Tunde Owolabi is also a footballer.

References

1973 births
Living people
Nigerian footballers
Royal Antwerp F.C. players
Viking FK players
Al-Wasl F.C. players
F.C.V. Dender E.H. players
K. Berchem Sport players
Ethnikos Asteras F.C. players
Association football midfielders
Nigerian expatriate footballers
Nigerian expatriate sportspeople in Belgium
Expatriate footballers in Belgium
Nigerian expatriate sportspeople in Norway
Expatriate footballers in Norway
Nigerian expatriate sportspeople in the United Arab Emirates
Expatriate footballers in the United Arab Emirates
Nigerian expatriate sportspeople in Greece
Expatriate footballers in Greece